The  is a twin-engine aircraft used by the Japanese Imperial Navy during World War II and was used for reconnaissance, night fighter, and kamikaze missions. The first flight took place in May 1941. It was given the Allied reporting name "Irving", since the earlier reconnaissance version the J1N1-C, was mistaken for a fighter.

Design and development
In mid-1938 the Japanese Imperial Navy requested a twin-engine fighter designed to escort the principal bomber used at the time, Mitsubishi G3M "Nell". The operating range of the standard Navy fighter, the Mitsubishi A5M "Claude", was only 1,200 km (750 mi), insufficient compared with the 4,400 km (2,730 mi) of the G3M. Moreover, at the time, the potential of the "Zero", then still under development, remained to be evaluated, stressing the need for a long-range escort fighter, much as the Luftwaffe had done with the Messerschmitt Bf 110 Zerstörer, introduced the year before.

In March 1939, Mitsubishi and Nakajima began the development of a project 13-Shi. The prototype left the factory in March 1941 equipped with two 843 kW (1,130 hp) Nakajima Sakae 21/22, 14-cylinder radial engines. There was a crew of three, and the aircraft was armed with a 20 mm Type 99 cannon and six 7.7 mm (.303 in) Type 97 aircraft machine guns. Four of these machine guns were mounted in two rear-mounted powered turrets, the weight of which reduced the performance of the aircraft considerably. Because of the sluggish handling, being used as an escort fighter had to be abandoned. Instead, production was authorized for a lighter reconnaissance variant, the J1N1-C, also known by the Navy designation Navy Type 2 Reconnaissance Plane. One early variant, the J1N1-F, had a spherical turret with one 20 mm Type 99 Model 1 cannon mounted immediately behind the pilot.

Operation history

In early 1943, Commander Yasuna Kozono of the 251st Kōkūtai in Rabaul came up with the idea of installing 20 mm cannons, firing upwards at a 30-degree angle in the fuselage. Against orders of central command, which was skeptical of his idea, he tested his idea on a J1N1-C as a night fighter. The field-modified J1N1-C KAI shot down two B-17s of 43rd Bomb Group attacking air bases around Rabaul on 21 May 1943.

The Navy took immediate notice and placed orders with Nakajima for the newly designated J1N1-S nightfighter design. This model was christened the Model 11 Gekkō ("Moonlight"). It had a crew of two, eliminating the navigator position. Like the KAI, it had twin 20 mm Type 99 Model 1 cannon firing upward in a 30° upward angle, but added a second pair firing downward at a forward 30° angle, allowing attacks from above or below. This arrangement was effective against B-17 Flying Fortress bombers and B-24 Liberators, which usually had Sperry ball turrets for ventral defense. The Gekkō's existence was not quickly understood by the Allies, who assumed the Japanese did not have the technology for night fighter designs. Early versions had nose searchlights in place of radar. Later models, the J1N1-Sa Model 11a, omitted the two downward-firing guns and added another 20 mm cannon to face upward as with the other two. Other variants without nose antennae or searchlight added a 20 mm cannon to the nose.

The J1N1-S was used against B-29 Superfortresses in Japan, though the lack of good radar and insufficient high-altitude performance handicapped it, since usually only one pass could be made against the higher-speed B-29s. However, some skillful pilots had spectacular successes, such as Lieutenant Sachio Endo, who was credited with destroying eight B-29s and damaging another eight before he was shot down by a B-29 crew, Shigetoshi Kudo (nine victories), Shiro Kurotori (six victories), and Juzo Kuramoto (eight victories); the last two claimed five B-29s during the night of 25–26 May 1945. Another Gekkō crew shot down five B-29's in one night, but these successes were rare. Many Gekkō's were also shot down or destroyed on the ground.

Variants

 J1N1 : Three seaters long-range fighter. Two of prototypes and seven of supplementary prototypes.
 J1N1 KAI : Night Fighter converted from J1N1.
 J1N1-C : Long-range reconnaissance aircraft. Later re-designated J1N1-R.
 J1N1-C KAI : Night Fighter converted from J1N1-C.
 J1N1-R : Long-range reconnaissance aircraft.
 J1N1-F : Observation aircraft. A little number of prototypes only. Equipped G5N2 turret or G4M2 turret.
 J1N1-S : Night fighter aircraft. Armed with 2 × 20 mm forward up-firing Type 99 cannons and 2 × 20 mm forward under-firing Type 99 cannons.
 J1N1-Sa : Night Fighter same as above, armed with 3 × 20 mm forward up-firing Type 99 cannons.

Surviving aircraft
Only one J1N1-S Gekkō survives today. Following the occupation of the home islands, U.S. forces gathered 145 interesting Japanese aircraft and sent them to the United States aboard three aircraft carriers. Four Gekkō's were in this group: three captured at Atsugi and one from Yokosuka. Serial Number 7334, the aircraft from Yokosuka, was given Foreign Equipment number FE 3031 (later changed to T2-N700). The airplane was moved to the Air Materiel Depot at Middletown, Pennsylvania, on 23 January 1946.

The Maintenance Division at Middletown prepared the Gekkō for flight tests, overhauling the plane's engines (the same make/model as the Zero had used) and replacing the oxygen system, radios, and some flight instruments with American equipment. Mechanics completed this work by 9 April. The Navy transferred Gekkō 7334 to the Army in early June, and an army pilot flew the Gekkō on 15 June 1946, for about 35 minutes. At least one other test flight took place before the Army Air Forces flew the fighter to an empty former Douglas C-54 factory at Park Ridge, Illinois, for storage. The remaining three Gekkōs were scrapped.

In 1949, the Gekkō was given to the Smithsonian's National Air Museum, but remained in storage at Park Ridge, Illinois. The collection of museum aircraft at Park Ridge numbered more than 60 airplanes when the war in Korea forced the United States Air Force to move it to the Paul E. Garber Preservation, Restoration, and Storage Facility in Suitland, Maryland. Gekkō 7334 was dumped outside the restoration facility in a large shipping crate in 1953 where it remained until building space became available in 1974. In 1979, NASM staff selected Gekkō 7334 for restoration.

Following restoration of the museum's Mitsubishi Zero in 1976, the Gekkō became the second Japanese aircraft to be restored by NASM. The airframe was found to be seriously corroded from being outside for twenty years. At that time, it was the largest and most complex aircraft restoration project the NASM had undertaken. Work started on 7 September 1979, and ended 14 December 1983, following 17,000 hours of work. Today, Gekkō 7334 is fully restored and on display in the Steven F. Udvar-Hazy Center in Chantilly, Virginia, US.

Specifications (J1N1-S)

See also

References

Notes

Bibliography

 Francillon, René J. Japanese Aircraft of the Pacific War. London: Putnam & Company Ltd., 1970 (2nd edition 1979). .

J01N
J01N, Nakajima
World War II night fighter aircraft
Low-wing aircraft
J01N, Nakajima
Aircraft first flown in 1941
Twin piston-engined tractor aircraft